Ryan Potulny (born September 5, 1984) is an American former professional ice hockey center. He is currently an assistant coach for the University of Minnesota men's ice hockey team.

Playing career
Potulny was drafted in the third round, 87th overall, at the 2003 NHL Entry Draft by the Philadelphia Flyers after playing two years with the USHL's Lincoln Stars. He spent the next three seasons playing collegiate hockey with the Minnesota Golden Gophers, recording 68 goals and 50 assists for a total of 118 points in 100 games. Potulny ranked first in the nation with 38 goals and 63 points during his last season with the Gophers, 2005–06, and was named an All-WCHA First Team Honoree and was a finalist for the Hobey Baker Memorial Award.

Potulny signed a 2-year entry level contract with the Flyers on March 29, 2006. He played his first two professional games with the Flyers at the tail-end of the 2005–06 season, making his NHL debut on April 7, 2006 and also recording his first point. He split the 2006–07 season with the Flyers and the AHL's Philadelphia Phantoms.

On April 24, 2008, Potulny scored the game-winning goal at 2:58 in the fifth overtime in Game 5 of the East Division Semifinals. The game's total time was 142:58, at that time an AHL record for longest game.

Potulny was traded from the Flyers to the Edmonton Oilers on June 6, 2008 in exchange for Danny Syvret. He then signed a one-year deal with the Oilers on June 14, 2008.

On September 8, 2010, Potulny signed a one-year two-way contract as a free agent with the Chicago Blackhawks. He ultimately played in only three games with the Blackhawks, spending much of the season with their AHL affiliate in Rockford.

On February 28, 2011, Potulny was traded to the Ottawa Senators along with a second round draft pick in the 2011 entry draft in return for a conditional seventh-round pick in the 2012 entry draft and Chris Campoli.

On July 1, 2011, Potulny signed a two-year two-way contract worth $525,000 dollars per year with the second year on a one-way basis, with the Washington Capitals. He was assigned to AHL affiliate, the Hershey Bears for the duration of his contract with the Capitals.

Upon completion of his contract with the Capitals, Potulny signed in Russia as a free agent on a one-year deal with Avangard Omsk of the Kontinental Hockey League on May 30, 2013. Potulny sought a release from his contract with Omsk just three months later, having never featured in the KHL, before belatedly returning to the Bears for the remainder of the season on December 22, 2013.

After three seasons with the Hershey Bears, Potulny signed a one-year AHL contract with the Hartford Wolf Pack, an affiliate of the New York Rangers on August 6, 2014.

On June 11, 2015, Potulny left North America to sign a one-year contract with Finnish club, Lahti Pelicans of the top-tier Liiga.

On 28 August 2017, Potulny agreed a deal with the Braehead Clan of the United Kingdom's Elite Ice Hockey League. Potulny retired at the conclusion of the season to take up an assistant coach role at the University of Minnesota.

Family
He is the younger brother of Grant Potulny, a Senators' draft pick in 2000 formerly an assistant coach with the Minnesota Golden Gophers ice hockey team. Grant is now the head coach of Northern Michigan University men's hockey program.

Career statistics

Regular season and playoffs

International

Awards and honors

References

External links

 

1984 births
American men's ice hockey centers
Binghamton Senators players
Braehead Clan players
Chicago Blackhawks players
Edmonton Oilers players
EHC Black Wings Linz players
Hartford Wolf Pack players
Hershey Bears players
Ice hockey people from North Dakota
Lahti Pelicans players
Lincoln Stars players
Living people
Minnesota Golden Gophers men's ice hockey players
Ottawa Senators players
Sportspeople from Grand Forks, North Dakota
Philadelphia Flyers draft picks
Philadelphia Flyers players
Philadelphia Phantoms players
Rockford IceHogs (AHL) players
Springfield Falcons players
Stadion Hradec Králové players
AHCA Division I men's ice hockey All-Americans
American expatriate ice hockey players in Canada
American expatriate ice hockey players in Scotland
American expatriate ice hockey players in Austria
American expatriate ice hockey players in the Czech Republic
American expatriate ice hockey players in Finland